Himmel und Erde ('Heaven/sky and earth')—Himmel un Ääd in the Rhineland—is a traditional German and Dutch dish most popular in the regions of the Rhineland, Westphalia, Lower Saxony, and Gelderland. In Dutch this dish is known as hete bliksem ('hot lightning'). It was also popular in the past in Silesia. The dish consists of black pudding, fried onions, and mashed potato with apple sauce. It has been known since the 18th century. 

The name of the dish originates from the name of two of the main ingredients. A German dialect word for potato is Erdapfel ('earth apple')—Äädappel in the Rhineland—so there are two kinds of "apples" in the dish: apples from trees, i.e. from the sky, and the potatoes from the ground.

References

External links
recipe

Rhenish cuisine
Silesian cuisine
Westphalian cuisine
Dutch cuisine